South American George is a 1941 British, black-and-white, comedy film directed by Marcel Varnel and starring George Formby in a dual role, Linden Travers, Enid Stamp-Taylor, Felix Aylmer, Ronald Shiner as Swifty, Mavis Villiers and Herbert Lomas. It was produced by Columbia (British) Productions.

Synopsis
A press agent hurries to bring in a substitute after a South American opera star flops. A lookalike takes over from the tenor, but chaos ensues when the bogus singer finds himself hunted by paid assassins.

Cast
George Formby as George Butters/Gilli Vanetti
Linden Travers as Carole Dean
Enid Stamp-Taylor as Frances Martinique	
Jacques Brown as Enrico Richardo
Felix Aylmer as Mr Appleby
Ronald Shiner as Swifty
Alf Goddard as Slappy
Gus McNaughton as George White
Mavis Villiers as Mrs Durrant
Herbert Lomas as Mr Butters
Cameron Hall as Muriel George
Eric Clavering as Mr Durrant
Beatrice Varley as Mrs Butters

Critical reception
According to TV Guide, "Formby's comic talents give the unlikely story a few fun moments, though the film is for the most part a hit-and-miss effort".

References

External links
 
 
 

1941 films
1941 comedy films
1940s English-language films
Films directed by Marcel Varnel
Columbia Pictures films
British comedy films
British black-and-white films
Films produced by Marcel Varnel
1940s British films